Route 269 is a two-lane north-south highway on the south shore of the Saint Lawrence River, in Quebec, Canada. Its northern terminus is close to Saint-Gilles at the junction of Route 116, and the southern terminus is at the junction of Route 173 in Armstrong, part of Saint-Théophile. The stretch between Saint-Gilles and Kinnear's Mills is very scenic, rising and dipping in the Appalachians.

List of towns along Route 269

 Saint-Gilles
 Saint-Patrice-de-Beaurivage
 Saint-Jacques-de-Leeds
 Kinnear's Mills
 Thetford Mines (Pontbriand)
 Thetford Mines (Robertsonville)
 Adstock (Sacré-Coeur-de-Marie)
 Adstock (Saint-Méthode)
 La Guadeloupe
 Saint-Honoré-de-Shenley
 Saint-Martin
 Saint-Théophile

See also
 List of Quebec provincial highways

References

External links 
 Route 269 on Google Maps
 Provincial Route Map (Courtesy of the Quebec Ministry of Transportation) 

269